FIL or Fil may refer to:

People 
 Father-in-law
 Fil Barlow (born 1963), Australian cartoonist
 Fil Delacruz (born 1950), Filipino artist
 Fil Fraser (1932–2017), Canadian broadcaster, filmmaker, civil servant and educator
 Fil Hearn (born 1938), American architectural and art historian
 Joseph Fil (born 1953), American army general
 Svitlana Fil (born 1969), Soviet rower
 Zbigniew Fil (born 1977), Polish musician

Sport 
 Federation of International Lacrosse
 Florida Instructional League, an American baseball league
 Florida International League, a defunct American baseball league
 International Luge Federation

Other uses 
 Al-Fil, the 105th sura of the Qur'an
 Fidelity International Limited, an American investment management company
 FIL file (disambiguation)
 Filipino language
 Filmjölk, a Swedish fermented milk product
 Viili, a variant
 Firestone Indy Lights, an American developmental automobile racing series
 Functional Imaging Laboratory, at University College London
 Guadalajara International Book Fair,
Filecoin, a cryptocurrency

See also
 Fils (disambiguation)